The flower  may refer to:

 Guy Lafleur (born 1951), a Canadian ice hockey player
Marc-André Fleury (born 1984), a Canadian ice hockey goaltender for the Chicago Blackhawks
 Oroxylum indicum, a flowering tree in several languages
 The Flower by John Light and Lisa Evans, a Hampshire Illustrated Book Awarded work

See also 
 Lafleur (disambiguation), the French equivalent
 Flower (disambiguation)
 deflower